Ilmari Niskanen (born 27 October 1997) is a Finnish professional footballer who plays as a left winger for Scottish Premiership club Dundee United and the Finland national team.

Club career
Born in Kiuruvesi, in September 2020 he signed for German club FC Ingolstadt. In August 2021 his transfer to Scottish club Dundee United was initially delayed due to work permit issues, before eventually completing on 20 August 2021.

International career
Niskanen represented Finland at under-17, under-19 and under-21 youth levels, before making his senior international debut in 2020.

International goals

Honours

Individual
 Veikkausliiga Player of the Month: July 2020

References

1997 births
Living people
People from Kiuruvesi
Finnish footballers
Finland youth international footballers
Finland under-21 international footballers
Finland international footballers
Kuopion Palloseura players
Pallo-Kerho 37 players
SC Kuopio Futis-98 players
FC Ingolstadt 04 players
Dundee United F.C. players
Veikkausliiga players
Kakkonen players
3. Liga players
Association football wingers
Finnish expatriate footballers
Finnish expatriate sportspeople in Germany
Expatriate footballers in Germany
Finnish expatriate sportspeople in Scotland
Expatriate footballers in Scotland
Scottish Professional Football League players
Sportspeople from North Savo